The BYU–Hawaii Seasiders (also Brigham Young–Hawaii Seasiders and BYUH Seasiders) were the 11 varsity athletic teams that represented Brigham Young University–Hawaii, located in Laie, Hawaii, in NCAA Division II intercollegiate sports. The Seasiders competed as members of the Pacific West Conference before dropping their athletic program after the 2016–17 season.

History
The school won eleven NCAA national championships: two in women's volleyball and nine tennis championships (two men's and seven women's). In its early days, BYU–H also won a National Rugby Championship in 1967, as declared by the Los Angeles Rugby Union. Basketball and volleyball games were held in the George Q. Cannon Activities Center. The campus also holds nine tennis courts, an outdoor swimming pool, and soccer and softball fields. Most conference home games in volleyball and women's basketball as well as additional home games in men's basketball were broadcast live around the world on BYUtv Sports. The Seasiders ended their athletic programs after the 2016–17 season.

Varsity Sports

National championships

Team

References

External links